Charles Palmerston Anderson (September 8, 1865 – January 30, 1930) was the seventeenth Presiding Bishop of the Episcopal Church.

Early life and education
He was born in Kemptville, Ontario in Canada on September 8, 1865, the son of Henry Anderson and Maria Rose Sexton. He attended Trinity College School in Port Hope, Ontario. He was awarded a Doctor of Divinity by Trinity College, Toronto in 1900 and another by Western Theological Seminary in 1905.

Ordained ministry
Anderson was ordained deacon on December 11, 1887, and priest on December 16, 1888, by Bishop John Lewis of Ontario. After his ordination to the diaconate he was in charge of the Church of St. Augustine in Beachburg, Ontario from 1888 to 1891. In 1891 he became rector of Grace Church in Oak Park, Illinois.

Bishop
In 1900, Anderson was unanimously elected Coadjutor Bishop of Chicago during the first ballot of the special convention. He was consecrated on February 24, 1900, by the Bishop of Chicago William Edward McLaren. He succeeded as diocesan bishop on February 19, 1905, on the death of William Edward McLaren. On November 13, 1929, Anderson was elected to the highest post in the Episcopal church, to serve as Presiding Bishop and Primate. He also retained the bishopric of Chicago simultaneously. Anderson died only a few months after his election as primate.

Family
Anderson married Janet Glass of Belleville, Ontario in 1889 and together had four daughters and one son, the latter died in WWI.

See also
 List of presiding bishops of the Episcopal Church in the United States of America
 List of Episcopal bishops of the United States
 Historical list of the Episcopal bishops of the United States

References 

Presiding Bishops of the Episcopal Church in the United States of America
1930 deaths
1865 births
Episcopal bishops of Chicago